Whitsun Reef, also known as Whitson Reef, Whitsum Reef, and Julian Felipe Reef (Mandarin), is a reef at the northeast extreme limit of the Union Banks in the Spratly Islands of the South China Sea. It is the largest reef of the Union Banks.

Topography 
Until at least 1990s it was submerged most of the time and was visible above the water only during the low tide, at other times the reef could be detected due to the pattern of breaking waves. At the end of the 20th century small sand dunes had developed on the reef making a territorial claim possible (an International Court of Justice judgment in 2012 stated that “low-tide elevations cannot be appropriated"). The development of the dunes could have occurred naturally, but the rumors had it that the island was being built up by Vietnam and China.

Territorial disputes 

As of 2016, the reef was unclaimed, the reports to the contrary (Chinese control) were based on a confusion. However, due to the reef's strategic importance it was expected that the reef would be occupied "soon".

On 21 March 2021, about 220 Chinese fishing ships were moored at the reef, ostensibly taking shelter due to the sea conditions. The Philippines considers the reef to be a part of its exclusive economic zone and continental shelf, and protested the Chinese presence. Vietnam which also claims the reef as part of its territory also protested against Chinese presence in the area.

See also
 Great Wall of Sand
 Johnson South Reef Skirmish
 Nine-dash line
 Sino-Vietnamese conflicts (1979–1991)

References

External links
Our World Flashpoint: South China Sea, BBC, film documentary, July 2015.
 Whitsun Reef (Union Reefs)

Reefs of the Spratly Islands
Union Banks